Onoba aculeus, common name the pointed cingula, is a species of minute sea snail, a marine gastropod mollusk or micromollusk in the family Rissoidae.

Description 
The maximum recorded shell length is 4.2 mm.

Habitat 
Minimum recorded depth is 0 m. Maximum recorded depth is 115 m.

Distribution
This species occurs in European waters and in the North and Northeast Atlantic Ocean.

Distribution: Greenland; Greenland: West Greenland, East Greenland; Canada; Canada: Newfoundland, Gulf of St. Lawrence, Quebec, Nova Scotia, New Brunswick; USA: Maine, Massachusetts, Rhode Island, Connecticut; Eastern Atlantic: Iceland

References

 Gofas, S.; Le Renard, J.; Bouchet, P. (2001). Mollusca, in: Costello, M.J. et al. (Ed.) (2001). European register of marine species: a check-list of the marine species in Europe and a bibliography of guides to their identification. Collection Patrimoines Naturels, 50: pp. 180–213

External links

Rissoidae
Gastropods described in 1841